The Huntington Hammer were  a professional indoor football team that began play as a charter member of the Ultimate Indoor Football League (UIFL) for its inaugural 2011 season.  The Hammer were based in Huntington, West Virginia, with home games played at the Big Sandy Superstore Arena.

The Hammer were the third indoor football team to play in Huntington, succeeding the National Indoor Football League's River Cities LocoMotives (2001) and the American Indoor Football Association's Huntington Heroes (2006-2008).  A team called the West Virginia Wild was set to play in the Continental Indoor Football League for 2009, but the franchise was revoked prior to the team's inaugural season.

History

2011

The team was owned by principal owner, Cecil Vandyke, along with co-owners Bill Nichols and Rick Kranz. On January 6, 2011, Josh Resignalo was named the first head coach in Hammer history. Resignalo was relieved on his coaching duties following an April 9 loss to the Saginaw Sting. Defensive coordinator, Michael Owens, was named the interim head coach. The Hammer experienced and up and down season, but managed to earn a 7–7 record, earning a playoff berth while winning the final game of the season. However, the Hammer experienced a season-low point total for the season, scoring just four points in a Semifinal matchup with the Eastern Kentucky Drillers.

2012
The Hammer were set to return to the UIFL in 2012, with the league expanding to 16 teams. However, before the season started, the UIFL announced that 6 of the 16 teams announced for 2012 would be folding, this included the Hammer.

Notable players

Roster

All-League selections
 RB Dray Mason
 DL Michael Robinson
 DB Jaret Sanderson
 KR Dray Mason

Head coaches

Season-by-season results

References

External links
Official website
UIFL press release announcing the team

 
2010 establishments in West Virginia
2012 disestablishments in West Virginia